The Royal Arch or Victoria Arch was a structure erected in Dundee, Scotland, between 1849 and 1853 and demolished in 1964. The monumental archway formerly stood over the access to the pier between Earl Grey Dock and King William IV Dock on the city's waterfront.

Background
The arch was built to commemorate a visit to the city by Queen Victoria and her husband, Prince Albert, in 1844. Victoria and Albert were on a visit to Duke of Atholl and his nephew, Lord Glenlyon. The royal boat landed near a triumphal arch erected for the occasion and the couple returned and embarked for London on 1 October 1844. It was the first visit by a British monarch to Dundee since the 17th century, although Victoria often visited the city during her reign because it was on her route to Balmoral Castle.

Design, construction and demolition
The first arch, designed by harbour engineer James Leslie, was made out of wood. Following a design competition for a more permanent structure, John Thomas Rochead, designer of the Wallace Monument near Stirling, was commissioned to design a permanent sandstone monument to replace the wooden arch. The Royal Arch, commonly known in Dundee as the Victoria Arch, was described as being in the "Anglo-Norman" style and consisted of a large triumphal arch, flanked by two smaller side arches, surmounted by two central turrets. It was situated between King William IV Dock and Earl Grey Dock on the south side of Dock Street, between the junctions of Castle Street, and Whitehall Crescent. Costing between £2,270 and £3,000, it was mostly funded by public subscription and the harbour trustees.

The arch was demolished on 16 March 1964, as part of land reclamation work required for the construction of the Tay Road Bridge. The structure was dynamited and the rubble deposited in both the King William IV and the Earl Grey Docks. Afterwards, the docks were land-filled to accommodate the slip roads for the new road bridge.

Legacy
Fragments of the arch were uncovered while the waterfront was being redeveloped in 2010, and its foundations were uncovered in 2014. In 2015, a petition was launched to build a replica of the arch. The Dundee City Council has stated that they "could never have rebuilt something like [the Royal Arch]", but granite paving slabs were put on the site of the arch, and four trees were planted nearby to commemorate the landmark.

Depictions in local culture
 A cast bronze model of the arch is situated outside the east entrance to the Overgate Centre in the middle of the city.  
 The arch was also used symbolically by Steven Holl Architects in their unsuccessful bid to build the annex of Victoria and Albert Museum, to be located on the banks of the River Tay. 
 A famous photograph of the arch taken by noted photojournalist Michael Peto in 1959, is held by the archive services of University of Dundee and is available to view online.
 In May 2016, a cardboard replica of the Arch was constructed in Dundee's Slessor Gardens, near the site of the original, as part of a Peoples Tower public art project, being taken down the next day. 1200 cardboard boxes were used to create the replica.

Sources

 unknown

Frances Groome

Buildings and structures in Dundee
Monuments and memorials in Scotland
Buildings and structures completed in 1853
19th century in Scotland
Monuments and memorials to Queen Victoria
Royal monuments in the United Kingdom
Demolished buildings and structures in Scotland
Buildings and structures demolished in 1964